Parallel Sons is a 1995 gay-themed drama film, written and directed by John G. Young and starring Gabriel Mann and Laurence Mason. It premiered at the 1995 Sundance Film Festival.

Plot
Seth is a youth with artistic leanings, a rural white young man with a fascination with black pop culture, and a dead-end life in an Adirondack village. He's alternatively sensitive and brutal with Kristen, who wants a sexual relationship that he explosively rejects.

Late one night, as he's closing the cafe where he works, a young black man, called Knowledge, attempts to rob him at gun point, but faints from illness. Seth takes the man, who is an escapee from a nearby local youthful offender boot camp. He nurses him in a family cabin and they begin a tentative friendship. When the sheriff learns of Seth's harboring a fugitive, a confrontation looms. Relationships between fathers and their children dominate the subplots

Cast
 Gabriel Mann as Seth Carlson
 Laurence Mason as Knowledge Johnson
 Murphy Guyer as Sheriff Mott
 Graham Alex Johnson as Peter Carlson
 Heather Gottlieb as Kristen Mott
 Josh Hopkins as Marty
 Maureen Shannon as Francine
 Julia Weldon as Sally Carlson
 Eric Granger as Police Officer

Awards and nominations
Won the Audience Award for "Best Feature" at the Frameline Film Festival (the San Francisco International Lesbian and Gay Film Festival). 
Won Grand Jury Award at Outfest (L.A. Outfest). 
Won Best Feature Award at Florida Film Festival.
Nominated for the Grand Jury Prize at Sundance Film Festival.

References

External links
 

1995 films
1995 LGBT-related films
American LGBT-related films
LGBT-related drama films
1995 drama films
1996 drama films
1996 films
1990s English-language films
1990s American films